William George Longmuir (born 10 June 1953) is a Scottish professional golfer.

Personal life 
Longmuir was born in Thundersley, Essex, England to Scottish parents. Despite having lived in England all his life, he regards himself as Scottish and is classified as such for international competition. Longmuir now lives in Thundersley, England. He has four children.

Professional career 
He turned professional in 1968 and played full-time on the European Tour from 1979 to 1993. He never won on tour but finished runner-up three times. He made the top 100 on the Order of Merit every year from 1976 to 1990.

Although Longmuir started playing some events on the European Tour in 1976, he originally found more success on its offshoot tour, the Safari Circuit, in Africa. Longmuir won the 1976 Nigerian Open for his first professional victory. He achieved this despite political violence emanating from the fringe of the course. He would win three more times in Africa.

Longmuir may be best known to international audiences for his performance in the 1979 Open Championship at Royal Lytham & St Annes Golf Club. He shot an opening round 65 (−6) to take a three-stroke lead over defending U.S. Open champion Hale Irwin. He shot a second round 74 but, in the difficult conditions, was still in solo third place only one behind Seve Ballesteros and three behind Irwin. A third round 77 drew him back but he was still in the top 10, 5 behind, with an outside chance. He then exploded with an 82 during the final round, the second worst round of the day, to finish at 298 (+14) in a tie for 30th. Although the tournament did not end well, he won the Tooting Bec Cup. The award goes to the British golfer who shot the lowest single round in the Open Championship.

Longmuir best year on the European Tour was in 1982. He finished tied in regulation at the German Open and Swiss Open. However, he would lose both events in playoffs to Bernhard Langer and Ian Woosnam, respectively. He would record a career-best 24th on the European Tour Order of Merit.

Longmuir kept his card for the remainder of the '80s but could not repeat this success. After his playoff loss to Woosnam he would only record one more top ten over the next five years. Like his 1979 early round success, his top achievement during this era may be sticking close to the lead at the early rounds of the Open Championship. At the 1984 Open Championship at St Andrews he shot 67 (-5) to hold the lead with Peter Jacobsen and Greg Norman. He shot one under the next day to stay in the top 5. Like 1979, he fell back mightily over the last two days and finished T55. He would win the Tooting Bec Cup again, however.

1990 was Longmuir's final good season on the European Tour. He recorded 3 top tens including his third and final runner-up finish. It was his final year inside the Top 100 on the Order of Merit.

Longmuir joined the European Senior Tour in 2003 and has had great success. In his rookie season he won two events and finished runner-up on the Order of Merit. By 2012 he finished in the top 30 of the Order of Merit every year and won eight events. In 2006 he played on the United States-based Champions Tour after coming through its Qualifying School. His son, Callum, often caddies for him on the European Senior Tour.

Professional wins (14)

Safari Circuit wins (4)
1976 Nigerian Open
1980 Nigerian Open
1983 Ivory Coast Open
1985 Nigerian Open

Other wins (2)
1976 Southland Charity Golf Classic
1996 Glenmuir Club Professional Championship

European Senior Tour wins (8)

Playoff record
European Tour playoff record (0–2)

Results in major championships

Note: Longmuir only played in The Open Championship.

CUT = missed the half-way cut
"T" indicates a tie for a place

Team appearances
Europcar Cup (representing Scotland): 1988
PGA Cup (representing Great Britain and Ireland): 1996 (tie), 2003
UBS Cup (representing the Rest of the World): 2003 (tie)

References

External links

Scottish male golfers
European Tour golfers
European Senior Tour golfers
PGA Tour Champions golfers
People from Thundersley
People from Redhill, Surrey
1953 births
Living people